K. C. Karuppannan is an Indian politician and a member of the Tamil Nadu Legislative Assembly. He was elected from Bhavani constituency as a candidate of the AIADMK in 2001,2016 and 2021.A very humble and calm headed person who reaches each and every individuals in his constituency and fulfill their needs, made him a hero among the people of his constituency.

Jayalalithaa appointed Karuppannan as Minister in her cabinet in May 2016.He served as the Minister of Environment and Pollution Control from (2016-2021).This was his first cabinet post in the Government of Tamil Nadu..

References 

Tamil Nadu MLAs 2016–2021
State cabinet ministers of Tamil Nadu
All India Anna Dravida Munnetra Kazhagam politicians
Year of birth missing
Tamil Nadu MLAs 2021–2026